Karet may refer to:

Karet railway station, in Kebon Melati, Jakarta, Indonesia
Karet, Iran or Koreyt-e Borumi, a village in Mosharrahat Rural District

See also
Carat (disambiguation)
Caret (disambiguation)
Carrot (disambiguation)
Karet Bivak Cemetery, in Jakarta, Indonesia
Djam Karet, a rock band in California